Khabawsokar (also read Khabawseker) was an Ancient Egyptian high official during the early to midst 3rd dynasty. He is famous for his tomb inscription and his unique nickname.

Identity

Family 
Khabawsokar was married to the priestess of Hathor, Hathor-neferhetepes.

Titles 
As a high-ranking official and priest, Khabawsokar bore several elite and pious titularies:
 Confidant of the king (Egyptian: Rekh-neswt). A title that allowed Khabawsokar to receive audiences with the pharaoh.
 Privy councilor (Egyptian: Sa'ab).
 High priest of Anubis (Egyptian: Heqa-netjer-Inpu).
 God's servant of Sokar (Egyptian: Hem-netjer-Seker).
 God's servant of Seshat (Egyptian: Hem-netjer-Seshat).
 God's servant of Seth (Egyptian: Hem-netjer-Setekh).

Career 
Khabawsokar's tomb inscriptions are of the highest interest to Egyptologists and historians alike. In fact, they belong to the earliest examples of richly decorated tomb niches with detailed lists comprising bureaucratic titles, priestly offices and honorary titles. Additionally, Khabawsokar is, by far, the official with the highest number of priesthood titles for his time.

In his tomb, Khabawsokar is depicted once as a sitting man in a tight gown, reaching out for an offering table full of bread (or cake). A jamb of a false door depicts him twice, each time looking into converse directions. His pose makes him look like he is stepping out of the door. On both of the jambs his real ("great") name and his nickname are spelled. Khabawsokar wears a fine curled wig, a heavy and finely ornamented gold collar and a belt with a golden lion head as a belt buckle. His kilt is made of leopard fur and his shoulder knots are jackal-shaped.

Possible contemporary office partners of Khabawsokar may have been Hesyre, Metjen, Pehernefer and Akhetaa. These are likewise known for their unusually rich decorated tomb chapels and for their accurately reported careers. However, it is not proven that these officials were related to each other in any way.

Tomb 
Khabawsokar's tomb, the double mastaba S-3037, was found in 1889 at North Saqqara by French archaeologist Auguste Mariette. The tomb once measured circa 33 x 19 metres and was built of mud bricks. A short corridor leads to a broad hall, forming a t-shaped crossway; the hall has walls which are niched and covered with polished limestone.

References 

People of the Third Dynasty of Egypt
27th-century BC people
Ancient Egyptian officials
Ancient Egyptian priests